Robert Lee Davis (January 15, 1930 – October 2, 2011) was an American football and wrestling coach. He served as the head football coach at Carson–Newman University in Jefferson City, Tennessee from 1964 to 1965 and the head wrestling coach at the University of Tennessee in Knoxville, Tennessee from 1970 to 1974.

References

External links
 

1930 births
2011 deaths
People from Bluefield, West Virginia
Players of American football from West Virginia
American football centers
Tennessee Volunteers football players
Coaches of American football from West Virginia
High school football coaches in Tennessee
Carson–Newman Eagles football coaches
Tennessee Volunteers football coaches
College wrestling coaches in the United States